Leigh Hoffman (born 11 June 2000) is an Australian track cyclist.

Early life
Hoffman was brought up in Whyalla in South Australia but moved as teenager to Adelaide to be nearer his training base at the SA Sports Institute, enrolling at the Immanuel College at Novar Gardens.

Career
Hoffman was a gold medalist at the 2022 Commonwealth Games in the men’s team sprint competition alongside Matthew Richardson and Matthew Glaetzer. Prior to this, he had won the team sprint at the UCI Track Nations Cup in Glasgow. In October 2022 at the World Championships held at the Quentin-en-Yvelines Velodrome, France, Hoffman won gold in the team sprint as Australia defeated the three-time defending champions Netherlands in the final.

References

2000 births
Living people
Australian male cyclists
Australian track cyclists
21st-century Australian people
Cyclists at the 2022 Commonwealth Games
Commonwealth Games gold medallists for Australia
UCI Track Cycling World Champions (men)
Cyclists from South Australia
Medallists at the 2022 Commonwealth Games